Leptodeuterocopus is a genus of moths in the family Pterophoridae.

Species
Leptodeuterocopus angulatus Gielis, 2006
Leptodeuterocopus citrogaster T. B. Fletcher, 1910
Leptodeuterocopus duchicela Gielis, 2006
Leptodeuterocopus exquisitus (Meyrick, 1921)
Leptodeuterocopus fortunatus (Meyrick, 1921)
Leptodeuterocopus gratus (Meyrick, 1921)
Leptodeuterocopus hipparchus (Meyrick, 1921)
Leptodeuterocopus neales (Walsingham, 1915)
Leptodeuterocopus panamaensis Gielis, 2006
Leptodeuterocopus sochchoroides T. B. Fletcher, 1910
Leptodeuterocopus sorongensis Gielis & de Vos, 2006
Leptodeuterocopus trinidad Gielis, 1996
Leptodeuterocopus tungurahue Gielis, 2006
Leptodeuterocopus zonites (Meyrick, 1913)

Deuterocopinae
Moth genera